Hongqiao Railway Station is a Shanghai Metro station located within the Shanghai Hongqiao railway station complex in the city's Minhang District. As part of a major transportation hub, it serves as an interchange between Lines 2, 10, and 17. It additionally serves as the western terminus the mainline service of Line 10, as well as the eastern terminus of Line 17. The station first opened as a Line 2 station on 1 July 2010, with Line 10 operations commencing on 30 November 2010. More than seven years later, Line 17 service was introduced with the opening of that line on 30 December 2017. With three island platforms totaling six platforms, the station is one of the largest in the system and features a cross-platform interchange between Lines 2 and 17.

The station is unique in which it is the only station to feature left-hand running through an island platform, in which case this applies to Line 10. For this line, doors open on the right instead of on the left.

History 
The westward extension of Line 2 toward Hongqiao railway station was completed in March 2010, however the station itself did not open until four months later, on 1 July 2010. Line 10 services commenced on 30 November of the same year, providing another subway line into downtown Shanghai. Line 17, which serves the western suburb of Qingpu District, began operations at the station on 30 December 2017, concurrent with the opening of the line.

Description 

Hongqiao Railway Station, located under the railway station of the same name, is an interchange station connecting lines 2, 10, and 17. The concourse level of the metro station is connected directly to the arrivals hall of the railway station and below the departures hall. There are staffed ticket counters and automatic ticket machines, restroom facilities, eight exits and two entrances. The exits are labeled after six zones, named alphabetically from A to F. Zones A and B are closest to the train ticketing booths. Zones A through D are labeled for the departure halls, while Zones E and F are closest to the long-distance bus terminal.

The metro station itself consists of three island platforms serving six tracks, and all platforms are fully accessible from the concourse via elevator. The middle island platform functions as an eastbound (downtown Shanghai-bound) cross-platform interchange between Line 17 and 2. On the north side (Platform 6), Line 17 trains disembark all passengers at its terminal station, while the south side (Platform 2) handles Line 2 eastbound trains. This provides an easy interchange for passengers continuing from Line 17 to Line 2 eastbound, allowing them to transfer without changing platforms. The northernmost island platform performs a similar function for westbound passengers changing from Line 2 to Line 17. Westbound Line 2 trains bound for  serve the north side (Platform 1), while departing westbound Line 17 trains serve the south side (Platform 5). Toilets are available on the east side of the middle island platform.

Station layout

Nearby landmarks 
 Shanghai Hongqiao railway station, directly connected to the metro station
 Terminal 2 of Shanghai Hongqiao International Airport, also connected via an underground walkway, however , the adjacent metro station eastbound on both Lines 2 and 10, serve the terminal directly

References 

Shanghai Metro stations in Minhang District
Line 2, Shanghai Metro
Line 10, Shanghai Metro
Railway stations in China opened in 2010
Line 17, Shanghai Metro
Railway stations in Shanghai